Ivan Vukas (born 16 September 1979 in Sinj, Yugoslavia) is a former Croatian handball national team player.

Vukas started his career in RK Zamet then named Zamet Autotrans and then later Crotek. In 2001 he moved to RK Metković.

He played for the national team at the 2004 European Men's Handball Championship where Croatia finished in fourth place. He also played at the 2006 Statoil World Cup where Croatia won the tournament.

Honours
Zamet
Croatian Cup 
Finalist (2): 2000, 2001

Metković
Croatian First League
Runner-up (3): 2001-02, 2002–03, 2003–04
Croatian Cup
Winner (1): 2002
Finalist (1): 2004

Moser
Austrian Cup 
Winner (1): 2010

References

External links
Ivan Vukas European Profile

1979 births
Living people
Croatian male handball players
People from Sinj
RK Zamet players
Croatian expatriate sportspeople in Spain
Croatian expatriate sportspeople in Germany
Croatian expatriate sportspeople in Austria
Croatian expatriate sportspeople in Cyprus